Serrasalmus is a genus of piranhas. They are collectively known as pirambebas; the "typical" piranhas like the piraya piranha are nowadays placed in Pygocentrus. Like all piranhas, Serrasalmus are native to South America.

These fish are predatory, have sharp teeth and generally have a rhomboid shape. In some, the shape is more ovoid, particularly in old specimens. Some Serrasalmus species can exceed  (S. manueli and S. rhombeus, according to OPEFE), placing them among the largest Serrasalmidae.

Species
There are at least 31 recognized species in this genus:
 Serrasalmus altispinis Merckx, Jégu & dos Santos, 2000
 Serrasalmus altuvei Ramírez, 1965 (caribe pinche)
 Serrasalmus auriventris (Burmeister, 1861)
 Serrasalmus brandtii Lütken, 1875 (white piranha)
 Serrasalmus compressus Jégu, Leão & dos Santos, 1991
 Serrasalmus eigenmanni Norman, 1929
 Serrasalmus elongatus Kner, 1858 (slender piranha, caribe pinche)
 Serrasalmus emarginatus (Jardine, 1841)
 Serrasalmus geryi Jégu & dos Santos, 1988 (violet line piranha)
 Serrasalmus gibbus Castelnau, 1855
 Serrasalmus gouldingi W. L. Fink & Machado-Allison, 1992 (blue tiger piranha)
 Serrasalmus hastatus W. L. Fink & Machado-Allison, 2001
 Serrasalmus hollandi (C. H. Eigenmann, 1915)
 Serrasalmus humeralis Valenciennes, 1850 (pirambeba)
 Serrasalmus irritans (W. K. H. Peters, 1877) (Iridescent piranha，"caribe pinche")
 Serrasalmus maculatus Kner, 1858 (spotted piranha)
 Serrasalmus manueli (Fernández-Yépez & Ramírez, 1967) (green tiger piranha, caribe parguasero)
 Serrasalmus marginatus Valenciennes, 1837
 Serrasalmus medinai Ramírez, 1965 (red-throated piranha)
 Serrasalmus nalseni Fernández-Yépez, 1969 (caribe pintado)
 Serrasalmus neveriensis Machado-Allison, W. L. Fink, López Rojas & Rodenas, 1993
 Serrasalmus nigricans (Spix & Agassiz, 1829)
 Serrasalmus nigricauda (Burmeister, 1861)
 Serrasalmus odyssei Hubert & Renno, 2010
 Serrasalmus rhombeus (Linnaeus, 1766) (redeye piranha, caribe amarillo)
 Serrasalmus sanchezi Géry, 1964 (sharp-snouted piranha)
 Serrasalmus scotopterus (Jardine, 1841)
 Serrasalmus serrulatus (Valenciennes, 1850) (caribe cortador)
 Serrasalmus spilopleura Kner, 1858 (speckled piranha)
 Serrasalmus stagnatilis (Jardine, 1841)
 Serrasalmus undulatus (Jardine, 1841)

References

 
 
 OPEFE

Serrasalmidae
Piranhas
Fish of South America